Oliva panniculata, common name the silk-clad olive, is a species of sea snail, a marine gastropod mollusk in the family Olividae, the olives.

Description
The length of the shell varies between 13.1 mm and 25 mm.

Distribution
Tjhis marine species occurs off East Africa and in the West Pacific

References

 Steyn, D.G & Lussi, M. (2005). Offshore Shells of Southern Africa: A pictorial guide to more than 750 Gastropods. Published by the authors. Pp. i–vi, 1–289
 Kilburn, R.N. (1980). The genus Oliva (Mollusca: Gastropoda: Olividae) in southern Africa and Mozambique. Annals of the Natal Museum. 24(1): 221–231
 Vervaet F.L.J. (2018). The living Olividae species as described by Pierre-Louis Duclos. Vita Malacologica. 17: 1-111

External links
 Duclos, P. L. (1835-1840). Histoire naturelle générale et particulière de tous les genres de coquilles univalves marines a l'état vivant et fossile publiée par monographie. Genre Olive. Paris: Institut de France. 33 plates: pls 1-12
 Melvill, J. C. & Standen, R. (1897). Notes on a collection of shells from Lifu and Uvea, Loyalty Islands, formed by the Rev. James and Mrs. Hadfield, with list of species. Part II (continued). Journal of Conchology. 8: 379-381, pl. 11

panniculata
Gastropods described in 1835